Ulów-Kolonia  is a village in the administrative district of Gmina Klwów, within Przysucha County, Masovian Voivodeship, in east-central Poland.

The village has a population of 160.

References

Villages in Przysucha County